Magnesian limestone can refer to:

 Dolomite (rock), rock made of magnesium carbonate
 Magnesian Limestone, the traditional name of a specific suite of Permian age rocks in north-east England